Ronald Lancaster may refer to:

 Ron Lancaster (1938–2008), Canadian Football League quarterback
 Ronald Lancaster (chemist) (born 1931), founder of Kimbolton Fireworks